Callia batesi is a species of beetle in the family Cerambycidae. It was described by Blackwelder in 1946.

References

Calliini
Beetles described in 1946